Christopher Kenneth Volstad (born September 23, 1986) is an American former professional baseball pitcher. He is a 2005 graduate of Palm Beach Gardens High School. He has played in MLB for the Florida Marlins, Chicago Cubs, Colorado Rockies, Pittsburgh Pirates and Chicago White Sox and in the KBO League for the Doosan Bears.

Volstad was drafted with the 16th pick in the 2005 Major League Baseball draft, the first of three first round picks for the Marlins that year.

Amateur career
Volstad played in amateur baseball tournaments from a young age, winning the championship in a 12-and-under travel competition for a team representing Broward and Palm Beach counties, against a team representing California's Central Valley, at the Baseball Hall of Fame in Cooperstown, New York. David Adams was a teammate.

Volstad graduated from Palm Beach Gardens Community High School in 2005, pitching to a 7-2 win–loss record with one save and a 0.41 earned run average (ERA) in 10 games for the school's baseball team as a senior, striking out 98 batters and walking just eight in 69 innings pitched. He led his team deep into the regional playoffs, coming up one game short of States.

Minor league career
In his first season of professional baseball, Volstad went 4-3 in 13 starts (with 55 K's in 65 IP) between the GCL Marlins and Jamestown Jammers of the New York–Penn League (Short season A) with a 2.22 ERA.

Volstad never returned to Jamestown, instead starting out  with the Greensboro Grasshoppers of the South Atlantic League (Class A). He went 11-8 over 26 starts with a 3.08 ERA. He was named the Marlins' #1 prospect in Baseball America's annual rankings.

Volstad started his second full pro season with the Jupiter Hammerheads of the Florida State League (Class A-Advanced). He struggled somewhat compared to his first season and a half, going 8-9 in 21 games (20 starts) with a 4.50 ERA. However, in later action with Florida's AA affiliate, the Carolina Mudcats of the Southern League, he improved to a 4-2 record and a 3.16 ERA.

In 2008, Volstad continued at Carolina, posting a 4-4 record, 3.36 ERA in 15 starts before being promoted to the major leagues.

Major league career

Pitching style
Volstad is a sinkerballer. He throws his sinker about half the time, averaging at 91 MPH. His secondary pitch is a mid-80s slider. He also features a straight fastball, a curveball, and a changeup. He throws his changeup primarily to left-handed hitters and his slider primarily to right-handed hitters.

Florida Marlins
On July 6, 2008, the Marlins purchased Volstad's contract and added him to the active roster. He made his major league debut the same day in a game against the Colorado Rockies, earning the win with 2 scoreless innings from the bullpen.

On July 11, 2008 Volstad started his first major league game against the Los Angeles Dodgers, earning the win and baffling the Dodger hitters with a 94 mph fastball and sharp 12-6 curveball. Volstad pitched  innings, and gave up 1 run on 5 hits, striking out 6. Volstad added his first major league hit in this game: a single off the Dodgers starter Eric Stults.

On August 7, 2008, Volstad delivered a masterful performance against the NL East-leading Philadelphia Phillies to reduce their lead in the division to  games. He pitched 6 innings of shutout baseball, outdueling Cole Hamels of the Phillies.

On July 8, 2009, Volstad pitched what many could argue as the best game of his career. Against the San Francisco Giants, he pitched his first career complete game allowing only five hits and no runs. His win helped the Marlins avoid a sweep in San Francisco.

In late August 2009 he was sent to the Triple-A New Orleans Zephyrs after a  inning start against the San Diego Padres.

In September 2010, Volstad was involved in a bench clearing brawl against the Washington Nationals. In the day's previous game, the Nationals' Nyjer Morgan intentionally ran into Marlins' catcher Brett Hayes on a play at home plate where Morgan was called out. Hayes separated his shoulder and it was determined later that night that he would miss the remainder of the season. In Morgan's first at-bat, Volstad threw at Morgan, hitting him. Morgan proceeded to steal two bases when the Marlins had an almost double digit lead, breaking an unwritten rule of ethics in the game. Offended by Morgan once again, Volstad threw another pitch at Morgan in his next at-bat, with it going behind Morgan's back. Morgan quickly charged the mound, despite the fact that Volstad stood nearly a foot taller than him. Morgan's punch connected, and Morgan was promptly knocked to the ground by Marlins' first baseman Gaby Sánchez, resulting in the bench-clearing brawl. After the game, Volstad sported a shiner from the Morgan punch. Volstad was suspended for 6 games because of the incident.

Chicago Cubs 
On January 5, 2012, The Marlins traded him to the Chicago Cubs for Carlos Zambrano. On May 18, 2012, Volstad was sent to Triple A Iowa after an 0-6 slump. On July 3, 2012, Volstad was called back up to the Cubs. He made a start later that day, giving up 6 runs over 4.1 innings, and getting the loss against the Atlanta Braves.

Kansas City Royals 
On October 26, 2012, Volstad was claimed off of waivers by the Kansas City Royals. On November 20, 2012 the Royals designated Volstad for assignment in order to clear room on the 40-man roster.

Colorado Rockies
On January 20, 2013, Volstad signed a minor league deal with the Colorado Rockies, with a chance to compete for a spot in the Colorado rotation.

After allowing 10 runs in 6 games for the Rockies, Volstad was placed on waivers on June 20, 2013. He became a free agent on October 1.

Los Angeles Angels of Anaheim
On November 6, 2013, he signed a minor league contract with the Los Angeles Angels of Anaheim.

Doosan Bears
Volstad pitched for the Doosan Bears of the Korea Baseball Organization in 2014. However, he was ineffective for the Bears, who released him at midseason.

Pittsburgh Pirates
On January 30, 2015, the Pittsburgh Pirates signed Volstad to a minor league deal. Then, after pitching in relief for two scoreless innings in a game on June 24, 2015, Volstad was designated for assignment alongside José Tábata on June 28 to make room for Gorkys Hernández and Steve Lombardozzi Jr.

Atlanta Braves
On October 30, 2015, Volstad signed a minor league deal with the Atlanta Braves. He was released on March 12, 2016.

Chicago White Sox
On March 24, 2016, Volstad signed a minor league deal with the Chicago White Sox. In December 2016, he signed another minor league contract with the White Sox. He was first called up by the White Sox in September 2017, and made 6 appearances for the club, including 2 starts. On January 22, 2018, Volstad re-signed a minor league deal with the Chicago White Sox. His contract was selected by the White Sox on April 12, 2018.

Volstad spent the majority of the 2018 season in the White Sox bullpen, compiling the most innings he's pitched in the majors since 2012. In  innings, he was 1-5 with a 6.27 ERA. Volstad was designated for assignment on July 27, 2018. He was released on July 31, 2018.

Cincinnati Reds
On February 16, 2020, Volstad signed a minor league deal with the Cincinnati Reds. He was released prior to the 2020 season.

References

External links

Career statistics and player information from Korea Baseball Organization

Living people
1986 births
People from Palm Beach Gardens, Florida
Baseball players from Florida
Major League Baseball pitchers
KBO League pitchers
American expatriate baseball players in South Korea
Florida Marlins players
Chicago Cubs players
Colorado Rockies players
Doosan Bears players
Pittsburgh Pirates players
Chicago White Sox players
Gulf Coast Marlins players
Jamestown Jammers players
Greensboro Grasshoppers players
Jupiter Hammerheads players
Carolina Mudcats players
New Orleans Zephyrs players
Iowa Cubs players
Colorado Springs Sky Sox players
Salt Lake Bees players
Tigres del Licey players
American expatriate baseball players in the Dominican Republic
Indianapolis Indians players
Charlotte Knights players